Established in 2007, RAK Hospital, the flagship brand of Arabian Healthcare Group is recognized as one of the United Arab Emirates's most acclaimed private hospitals. Built on the premise of bringing superior quality medical facilities to the doorstep of the local community as well as to serve the international medical tourists, the hospital offers outstanding infrastructure, finest medical acumen, excellent patient services yet remains affordable. The campus includes state-of-the art diagnostic facilities, surgical programs, operating theatre, cardiac labs, a stroke unit, and rehabilitation programs.

A private tertiary care, multi-speciality hospital and a four-time recipient of the US based Joint Commission International accreditation; the hospital has been specially designed as a premium healthcare and hospitality destination by US-based Ellerbe Becket of Mayo Clinic repute. The two sprawling buildings boast a built-up area of 140,000 sq ft, across three levels. All the rooms are in premium category, with a capacity of 65 beds which is being tripled to accommodate the growing demand. The institution is all set to become a 200-bed facility by 2024 as a result of its collaboration with CommonSpirit Health a leading U.S. healthcare provider.

Just an hour away from the Dubai International Airport, RAK Hospital has played a pivotal role in strengthening the UAE's position in the field of medical tourism by catering to a large number of patients who visit the country for cost-effective and reliable medical care. The hospital has been attracting international patients from GCC, Africa and several South Asian countries continuously. Additionally, to ease procedures for foreign patients, it has set up representative offices running in several countries comprising Ethiopia, Nigeria, Kenya, Ghana and Oman.

Areas of specialization 

Hundreds of testimonials have proved the clinical acumen of RAK Hospital as a leading healthcare institution. However, it is not just the medical and technical prowess that gives the hospital its sterling reputation; the unified effort of the entire workforce ensures that every single person who enters the premises feels confident, reassured and at peace. At the same time, the hospital is continuously updating its areas of excellence, while introducing more specializations to meet the increasing demand.

The centres of advanced healthcare at the hospital include: 
 Interventional Cardiology and Cardiac Surgery
 Orthopedic Surgery
 Laparoscopic Surgeries and Bariatric Surgery
 Neuro and Spine Surgery
 Urology
 RAK Eye Care Centre
 Physical Therapy and Rehabilitation
 Swiss Health Check

Interventional Cardiology and Cardiac Surgery A forerunner in cardiac surgery, RAK Hospital boasts of a fully equipped 24/7 cardiac catheterization lab and full electrophysiology set-up and is prepared to handle emergency situations and high-risk surgeries with a high success rate. The department offers services such as treatment of angina, arrhythmia, blockage of coronary arteries, valvular heart disease, as well as the full range of heart surgery. Unique in the UAE is the fact that coronary heart surgery at the hospital is performed on 'beating heart' – a bigger challenge for the team but truly optimizing the outcomes.

Orthopedic Surgery (Bone and Joint Centre) RAK Hospital prides itself in revolutionizing the orthopaedic care in UAE, introducing gyroscope-based knee implantation and the use of stem cell therapy in the treatment of arthritis and other joint-related issues. The Centre offers expert diagnosis, treatment and rehabilitation for adults and children with bone, joint or connective tissue disorders.

Laparoscopic Surgeries and Bariatric Surgery RAK Hospital has conducted several laparoscopic and bariatric surgery, gaining reputation for resolving critical and complicated procedures successfully. Backed by skilled surgeons who are adept at carrying out such procedures, the hospital has gained increasing trust among the local population as well as medical tourists who look to the hospital to provide them with excellent surgical expertise. Practically all major surgeries are performed minimally invasive with major benefits for the patients when it comes to postoperative recovery time and comfort.

Neuro and Spine Surgery Comprising neuro ICU, advanced radiology imaging and neuro-rehabilitation facilities, the Neuro and Spine Centre is fully equipped to deal with several complicated and high-risk surgeries. The Centre further offers round-the-clock emergency stroke management, specializing in diagnosis and management of low back pain, neck pain and paralysis, pediatric neurosurgery, diagnosis and management of chronic headaches and neuro-oncology services for brain, skull base and spinal tumour.

RAK Eye Care Centre The first fully dedicated eye speciality centre in Emirate of Ras Al Khaimah, the facility is equipped with the latest eye-care technologies and surgical platforms. The centre offers a wide range of procedures and services including cataract surgery, refractive surgery including femto laser LASIK corrections, glaucoma and vitreo retinal surgeries.

Physiotherapy and Rehabilitation The hospital's Physiotherapy and Rehabilitation Unit offers diverse treatments to enable people to overcome issues related to mobility, walk and balance disorders, abnormal gait pattern, poor posture and injury among other problems. In addition, the department has a strong focus on resolving challenges pre- and post-surgeries including rehabilitation after cardiac and neuro events and procedures.

Swiss Health Checks
Based on RAK Hospital's association with Sonnenhof Swiss Health, the well-known, leading healthcare group from Switzerland, top-quality care and service remain the prime focus. Following those standards, the hospital offers Swiss Health Checks. Many medical tourists avail this comprehensive service that also covers the stay at the hospital, UAE visa and complimentary transportation from [Dubai] to Ras Al Khaimah and back home. The services include exclusive packages for men and women with several tests and investigations at an affordable cost. With as much focus on prevention as on treatment, the hospital is also constantly educating the population on ways to live a healthy life, free of physical or mental stress.

Awards and achievements 
With several achievements under its belt, RAK Hospital has been repeatedly recognised on various platforms for its contribution to the UAE's healthcare industry and for its unique and innovative model.

Innovations 

Among the key drivers of RAK Hospital's growth is the innovative approach to healing. The hospital is known for providing many pioneering treatments and advanced procedures in the country. Some of the examples include:

 The first hospital in the UAE to perform cervical spine surgery using 3D printing technology and also multilevel hybrid cervical spine surgery.
 The first hospital to open a dedicated cardiac catheterization laboratory' in the Northern Emirates of UAE.
 Launched the first dedicated Neurosurgery and Spine Centre in the Northern Emirates.
 Introduced revolutionary stem-cell therapy for the treatment of arthritis and other joint related issues.
 The first hospital to perform a successful artificial cervical disc replacement surgery in the UAE.
 Launched gyroscope-based technology for more accurate alignment in knee replacement surgeries.
 Launched the life-saving and non-surgical balloon dilatation procedure for cardiac malformation.
 The first hospital in the UAE to introduce Multiplex PCR for accurate diagnostic testing of infectious diseases with a molecular biology and genetic testing division.
 The first hospital in the UAE to introduce painless stapled haemorrhoidectomy.
 Successful correction of a rare ileocaecal atresia in a one-day old new-born. In a 2-day old new-born, successful correction of mal-rotated bowel. In a 5-year-old child, after 3 unsuccessful operations abroad and other mal-rotated gut was corrected.
 Successful laparoscopic diagnosis and operation of a rare gastrointestinal stromal tumor of the small bowel.
 Successful thoracoscopy removal of a mediastinal cyst in a 5-year-old child and successful repair of a ruptured oesophagus (Boerhaave syndrome).
 The first hospital in the UAE to fully integrate the concept of wellness and spa services into treatments.
 The first hospital in the UAE to introduce the DAISY Award for to honour extraordinary nurses.
 Providing an easy, safer and non-invasive alternative for the treatment of enlarged prostate, RAK Hospital introduced a brand new innovative prostate steam treatment REZUM' water-vapour treatment for men suffering with enlarged prostate. The quick procedure takes only about 20 minutes and is a non-surgical option for benign prostatic hyperplasia (BPH).
 Neurologists at RAK Hospital are now using the new anti-CGRP therapy, a specific treatment designed to cut down the frequency of headaches. The anti-CGRP therapy targets CGRP – the protein known for causing migraine, reducing the frequency, severity, and duration of the headache episodes effectively. The treatment has already proved to be a huge success whilst showing a significant drop in migraine episodes by 50% to 60% every month.

RAK Hospital COVID-19 initiatives 

 The institution introduced Bamlanivimab monoclonal antibody therapy, a highly effective antibody treatment against COVID-19 which greatly reduces the risk of hospitalization or progression to severe disease, need for artificial ventilation and potential bad outcome 
 Launched a state-of-the-art laboratory for genotyping of the COVID-19 virus which helps detect mutations of the coronavirus, a crucial tool to help health systems stay ahead of outbreaks. 
 Unveiled Middle East's first ever comprehensive complimentary online COVID-19 rehabilitation program for COVID-19 long-haulers. The initiative was launched in association with ARISE UAE, the Private Sector Alliance for Disaster Resilient Societies, a network of private sector entities led by the United Nations Office for Disaster Risk Reduction (UNDRR). This sparked a lot of interest from the global media, establishing hospital's leadership on the subject.

References 

Hospitals in the United Arab Emirates
Hospitals established in 2007